The 2015 Quicken Loans Race for Heroes 500 was a NASCAR Sprint Cup Series race held on November 15, 2015, at Phoenix Raceway in Avondale, Arizona. Contested over 219 laps – shortened from 312 due to rain – on the one mile (1.6 km) oval, it was the 35th race of the 2015 NASCAR Sprint Cup Series season, ninth race of the Chase and final race of the Eliminator Round. Dale Earnhardt Jr. won the race, his third of the season. Kevin Harvick finished second. Joey Logano, Kyle Busch and Jimmie Johnson rounded out the top-five.

Johnson won the pole for the race and led 44 laps on his way to a fifth–place finish. Harvick led a race high of 143 laps on his way to a runner-up finish. There were eight lead changes among seven different drivers, as well as two cautions for 29 laps.

This was the 26th career victory for Earnhardt, third of the season, third at Phoenix International Raceway and 10th at the track for Hendrick Motorsports. It moved him to seventh in the points standings. The win clinched Chevrolet its 39th overall – 13th consecutive – manufacturer's championship. It would ultimately prove to be Earnhardt's final career victory before his retirement in 2017.

The Quicken Loans Race for Heroes 500 was carried by NBC Sports on the cable/satellite NBCSN network for the American television audience. The radio broadcast for the race was carried by the Motor Racing Network and Sirius XM NASCAR Radio.

Report

Background

Phoenix International Raceway (Jeff Gordon Raceway) – also known as PIR – is a one-mile, low-banked tri-oval race track located in Avondale, Arizona. It is named after the nearby metropolitan area of Phoenix. The motorsport track opened in 1964 and currently hosts two NASCAR race weekends annually. PIR has also hosted the IndyCar Series, CART, USAC and the Rolex Sports Car Series. The raceway is currently owned and operated by International Speedway Corporation.

The raceway was originally constructed with a  road course that ran both inside and outside of the main tri-oval. In 1991 the track was reconfigured with the current  interior layout. PIR has an estimated grandstand seating capacity of around 67,000. Lights were installed around the track in 2004 following the addition of a second annual NASCAR race weekend.

Phoenix International Raceway is home to two annual NASCAR race weekends, one of 13 facilities on the NASCAR schedule to host more than one race weekend a year. The track is both the first and last stop in the western United States, as well as the fourth and penultimate track on the schedule.

Jeff Gordon entered with a two–point over Kyle Busch. Kevin Harvick entered third three–points back. Martin Truex Jr. entered fourth six–points back. Carl Edwards entered fifth 13–points back. Brad Keselowski entered sixth 19–points back. Kurt Busch entered seventh 34–points back. Joey Logano entered eighth 69–points back.

Jeff Gordon Raceway
On June 11, 2015, Phoenix International Raceway announced that it would be renamed Jeff Gordon Raceway for the Sprint Cup Series race. Track President Bryan Sperber said that they "were thinking of it like an athlete getting the keys to the city. It (the idea) took off from there. Starting with the quirky layout of our track, it seems like Phoenix always does things a little different. We're the next-to-last race so a lot of good ideas will already have been implemented at other venues. We thought, 'We better step up our game' and do something really cool, that the fans can be a part of, that what we do for Jeff is remembered."

Chase-clinching scenarios
The following Chase-clinching scenarios were in play for the weekend's race.

Jeff Gordon: Clinched by virtue of his Martinsville victory.
Kyle Busch: Would have clinched with either a finish of third or better, fourth and at least one lap led or fifth and most laps led. (Finished fourth with one lap led)
Kevin Harvick: Would have clinched with a finish of second or better, third and at least one lap led or fourth and most laps led. (Finished second with most [143] laps led)
Martin Truex Jr., Carl Edwards, Brad Keselowski and Kurt Busch: All four could only guarantee advancement with a win, but could also qualify on points depending on how the rest of the Chase drivers do. (Truex Jr. finished 14th, Edwards 12th, Keselowski ninth and Kurt Busch seventh)
Joey Logano: Could only advance via a win (point deficit too big for advancement on points). Finished third.

Entry list
The entry list for the Quicken Loans Race for Heroes 500 was released on Monday, November 9 at 1:23 p.m. Eastern time. Forty-three cars were entered for the race. Ryan Ellis made his Sprint Cup Series debut in the No. 33 Hillman-Circle Sport LLC Chevrolet. Ryan Preece drove the No. 98 Premium Motorsports Ford. Erik Jones drove the No. 20 Joe Gibbs Racing Toyota while Matt Kenseth served the second of his two–race suspension.

First practice

Qualifying

He said that his team "didn’t have the summer that we wanted, but these guys have been working so hard on the No. 48 team and at Hendrick Motorsports. So, I’m very happy to see the progress and the direction things are going. It’s been a little bit, everywhere. If we keep doing that, we’re going to close this season out just like we want to and be ready for 2016.” Kurt Busch, who qualified second, said he felt that he "let the team down a little on that lap because our car is better than that. But starting upfront here is a big advantage and we’ll work on the car a little tomorrow to fine tune and be ready to go out and race on Sunday and hope for a win.” Joey Logano, who qualified 14th, said that he "just missed it a little bit. I wish we were in the next round and going for a pole, but the fact of the matter is we’re gonna start 14th and we’re gonna work on our car tomorrow and get it ready to win a race on Sunday.”

Qualifying results

Practice (post-qualifying)

Second practice

Final practice

Race

First half

Start
The race was scheduled to start at 12:45 p.m., but rain showers delayed the start of the race. After a delay of over six and a half hours, the cars began rolling off pit road just after 7:00 p.m. Under a clear night Arizona sky, Jimmie Johnson led the field to the green flag at 9:27 p.m. He wouldn't lead the first lap though. That honor went to Kurt Busch. He wouldn't be credited with leading those laps, however, after he was black-flagged for beating the control car (the leader) to the line on the initial start and was forced to serve a pass-through penalty. Following the race, Busch said he "had no reason to jump the start. I had no reason to get excited. We (thought we) had 312 laps to go race. But we’ve had a great season.” As a result, Johnson was credited with leading those seven laps. The first caution of the race flew on lap 41. This was a scheduled competition caution because of the rain. Kevin Harvick exited pit road with the lead after taking just right-side tires. Johnson was tagged for speeding on pit road. Danica Patrick was tagged for her crew being over the wall too soon. Both restarted the race from the tail-end of the field.

Second quarter
The race restarted on lap 48. The heavy betting favorite proceeded to drive away from the rest of the top-10 cars and put everyone up to 20th down a lap. Joey Logano kicked off a round of green flag stops on lap 119. Race leader Harvick pitted on lap 120 and handed the lead to Kyle Busch. He pitted the next lap and handed the lead to Brad Keselowski. He pitted on lap 124 and handed the lead to David Ragan. He pitted on lap 126 and the lead cycled back to Harvick. Trevor Bayne and Keselowski were both tagged for speeding on pit road and were forced to serve drive-through penalties.

Second half

Halfway

Logano was the first on pit road at lap 194 to kick off the next round of stops. Harvick pitted the next lap and handed the lead to Dale Earnhardt Jr. He pitted the next lap and handed the lead to Jeff Gordon. The second caution of the race flew on lap 196 for a two-car wreck in turn 3. Ricky Stenhouse Jr. got loose, hit the back of Joey Gase and sent them both into the wall. Earnhardt opted not to pit – having just made his stop prior to the caution – and assumed the race lead.

After three attempts to restart the race were waved off because of a safety vehicle sitting on the track in turn 4, the field continued to be under caution due to rain. The race was red-flagged on lap 220. After a few minutes, NASCAR called the race and Earnhardt was declared the winner for the 26th and final time in his career, similar to the rain-shortened 2015 Quicken Loans 400 in June when Kurt Busch scored his second win of the season. His victory also clinched the manufacturer's championship for Chevrolet.

Post-race

Driver comments
Earnhardt said that his team "had an idea that the rain was in the area, but all the circumstances that played out at the end of the race are just kind of luck I think. I want to give Greg (Ives, crew chief) a lot of credit and the guys. They gave us a good enough car to come here and qualify well. I think the reason why we won this race is because of the way we qualified to give ourselves a position to be up front all night."

After a second-place finish clinched his spot in the championship race, Harvick said that he didn't "want to be greedy and be disappointed with how it went today when you look at the big picture. I think it's definitely been a Chase that's been a little bit up and down for us, but the guys have battled through, and we've survived a lot of situations to be in contention for next week. You always want to win when you have a car like we did today, but I'll take it again next week." He also added that, while losing the race was bittersweet, his Budweiser Chevrolet "just really performed well today and we were able to lead a lot of laps and just really proud of the guys for the decisions that they made overnight to get that last little bit out of the car today and how it performed was really good. Just caution came out at the wrong time, and we didn't get to make up the ground on the racetrack under green, where Dale was pitted and the way that they came out of the pits just didn't time out well. But still proud of our group, and sometimes you win some of those things, sometimes you don't, but in the end the big picture is what it's all about.”

After a third-place finish wasn't enough to advance Logano to the championship race, he said that it's not easy "to play the race with rain in the area. You don’t know what’s gonna happen, but you just hope there’s another shot. You hope that there’s a restart and if two of them slip up and you’re able to put it three-wide on the bottom, or do something like that, but just didn’t ever have the opportunity there at the end. We had plenty of opportunities to try and get ourselves to the front, we just weren’t as fast at the 4 (Kevin Harvick). We were a solid second place car, but (Dale Earnhardt) Junior timed it out really well when they pitted to that caution and it worked out really well for them.” He also said that he "can't help the weather. I guess it wasn’t in the cards tonight, but I’m still super proud of what this Pennzoil team has done all year.”

Following a fourth-place finish that advanced Kyle Busch to the championship race, he said that he was gratified with "this team. (Crew chief) Adam Stevens and these guys, they worked hard and they persevered all through the beginning part of the season when I was gone working with David Ragan, Erik Jones and Matt Crafton and those guys that drove my race car. But once I was able to return, it felt pretty good to get back in the car and have my team guys motivated and ready to have me back, and we've really excelled since then.”

Following a sixth-place finish, Gordon said that drivers "want to win when you have a car like we did today, but I'll take it again next week. We're excited about the opportunity to go down there (Homestead). Certainly for me, my final race. I can't think of anything sweeter than just having that opportunity to go down there and battle for the championship and seeing what happens.”

After being black-flagged at the start of the race and rallying to a seventh-place finish, Kurt Busch said that he "had a great season, we won two races, sat on three poles. We did everything possible to put polish on a season like this and get out there with elbow grease and work hard it, and you know, when there’s some tarnish that’s sitting there, polish and polish and polish, that’s all I kept doing all year.”

After a 14th-place finish was enough to beat out Carl Edwards for the final championship race spot, Martin Truex Jr. said that it was "obviously an exciting day for everybody at Furniture Row Racing and me. Just super proud of my team for the season we've been able to put together, and I feel like we've overcome a lot of obstacles. We have kind of overcome a lot of odds, and I'm just proud to be part of this group and looking forward to having the opportunity to do something that we've all dreamed about our whole lives next weekend."

Race results

Race statistics
8 lead changes among 7 different drivers
2 cautions for 29 laps
Time of race: 2 hours, 3 minutes, 22 seconds
Average speed: 
Dale Earnhardt Jr. took home $462,976 in winnings

Race awards
 Coors Light Pole Award: Jimmie Johnson (25.147)
 3M Lap Leader: Kevin Harvick (143 laps)
 American Ethanol Green Flag Restart Award: Dale Earnhardt Jr.
 Duralast Brakes "Bake In The Race" Award: Jimmie Johnson
 Freescale "Wide Open": Kevin Harvick
 Ingersoll Rand Power Move: Dale Earnhardt Jr. (7 positions)
 MAHLE Clevite Engine Builder of the Race: Hendrick Engines, #4
 Mobil 1 Driver of the Race: Kevin Harvick (144.7 driver rating)
 Moog Steering and Suspension Problem Solver of The Race: Aric Almirola (crew chief Trent Owens (-0.178 seconds))
 NASCAR Sprint Cup Leader Bonus: No winner: rolls over to $30,000 at next event
 Sherwin-Williams Fastest Lap: Carl Edwards (Lap 5, 26.103)
 Sunoco Rookie of The Race: Matt DiBenedetto

Media

Television
NBC Sports was scheduled to covered the race on the television side but NBCSN covered the race due to rain. Rick Allen,  two–time Phoenix winner Jeff Burton and Steve Letarte had the call in the booth for the race. Dave Burns, Mike Massaro, Marty Snider and Kelli Stavast handled pit road on the television side.

Radio
MRN had the radio call for the race, which was simulcast on Sirius XM NASCAR Radio. Jeff Striegle, Alex Hayden and 1998 race winner Rusty Wallace called the race from the booth when the field was racing down the frontstretch. Dan Hubbard called the race from atop the turn 1 suites when the field was racing through turns 1 and 2. Kyle Rickey called the race from a billboard outside turn 4 when the field was racing through turns 3 and 4. Winston Kelley, Pete Pistone and Steve Post handled pit road on the radio side.

Standings after the race

Drivers' Championship standings

Manufacturers' Championship standings

Note: Only the first sixteen positions are included for the driver standings.

References

Quicken Loans Race for Heroes 500
Quicken Loans Race for Heroes 500
NASCAR races at Phoenix Raceway